Reversion may refer to:
 Reversion (2012 film), a computer animated short film
 Reversion (2015 film), an American science fiction thriller film
 Reversion (genetics), a back mutation
 Reversion (law)
 Reversion (software development)
 Series reversion, in mathematics

See also
 Reversal (disambiguation)
 Reverse (disambiguation)
 Reversis, a card-game
 Reverted (film), a 1994 film